Neactina is a genus of flies in the family Stratiomyidae.

Species
Neactina opposita (Walker, 1854)
Neactina ostensackeni (Lindner, 1958)
Neactina simmondsii (Miller, 1917)

References

Stratiomyidae
Brachycera genera
Taxa named by Günther Enderlein
Diptera of Australasia